Graeme Morton  is an Australian composer and conductor, currently the Director of the Brisbane Chamber Choir and Director of Music at St John's Anglican Cathedral. He is formerly the Director of Music at St Peters Lutheran College, where he founded the St Peters Chorale. Graeme is also a Senior Lecturer, Choral Conducting Fellow and Master of Music Program Convenor at the University of Queensland's School of Music.

References

Living people
Australian male composers
Australian composers
21st-century conductors (music)
21st-century Australian male musicians
21st-century Australian musicians
Year of birth missing (living people)